Alejandro Berrio Hernández (born August 7, 1976) is a Colombian professional boxer.

Professional career

Known as "Ñaco", Berrio turned pro in 1997 and won the Vacant IBF Super Middleweight Title with a TKO win over Robert Stieglitz in early 2007 in Rostock, Germany.  Berrio sent Stieglitz to the canvas twice with right hands, with the referee stopping the fight with 23 seconds left in the third. It was a rematch between the two fighters, with Stieglitz winning the first bout in late 2005 via TKO.

He lost his title against Lucian Bute in Montreal on 2007-10-19 by TKO on the 11th round.

Professional boxing record

See also
List of world super-middleweight boxing champions

References

External links

Alejandro Berrio Professional Bio - Boxing360.com

|-

1976 births
Living people
Colombian male boxers
Sportspeople from Cartagena, Colombia
World super-middleweight boxing champions
International Boxing Federation champions
21st-century Colombian people